Epilobium ciliatum, known by the common names fringed willowherb, American willowherb, slender willow herb, and northern willow herb is a species of flowering plant in the willowherb family Onagraceae. This species is native to much of North America, southern South America, and East Asia. It is an introduced species in much of Eurasia and Australia.

This perennial herbaceous plant usually occurs in wetlands, but may be found in a great variety of habitats, including disturbed areas and roadsides, at elevations below .

Description
Epilobium ciliatum is a clumping perennial often exceeding  in height. It has thickly veined lance-shaped leaves which may be up to 15 centimeters long toward the base of the plant. The foliage, stem, and inflorescence are covered in bristly hairs and glands.

There are four sepals. The regular, trumpet-shaped flowers have four petals which are so deeply notched they look like four pairs. They are white to light purple or pink with dark veining. There are eight stamens and a club-shaped stigma. The fruit is a narrow, hairy, four-chambered capsule up to 10 centimeters in length which may be held on a long stalk. The seeds are downy and can float for long distances with the wind.

Subspecies
Three subspecies are currently recognized:
 Epilobium ciliatum ssp. ciliatum 
 Epilobium ciliatum ssp. glandulosum — (Lehm.) Hoch & P.H.Raven 
 Epilobium ciliatum ssp. watsonii — (Barbey) Hoch & P.H.Raven

Taxonomy
Epilobium ciliatum may be a cryptic species complex. The Rocky Mountain Willowherb (Epilobium saximontanum) is sometimes included as yet another subspecies.

The three currently recognized subspecies may each constitute a distinct species. If so, E. ciliatum ssp. watsonii would perhaps use the name E. adenocaulon and include those populations, while E. ciliatum ssp. glandulosum would perhaps use the name E. bergianum and include those populations. The others named  E. ciliatum ssp. ciliatum populations would remain.

Distribution and habitatEpilobium ciliatum'' is native to the southern part of Canada and most of the United States of America. It arrived in northern Europe early in the 20th century and spread rapidly, reaching Finland in about 1920. It is a plant of moist places, stream-sides, ditches, ponds, gardens, roadsides, recently cleared areas and wasteland.

References

External links

Jepson Manual Treatment for Epilobium ciliatum
CalFlora database — Epilobium ciliatum (Slender Willow herb)
Epilobium ciliatum — Photo gallery

ciliatum
Flora of North America
Flora of southern South America
Flora of temperate Asia
Flora of the California desert regions
Taxa named by Constantine Samuel Rafinesque
Flora without expected TNC conservation status